The following is a list of notable people who attended the Bronx High School of Science in the Bronx, New York City.

Academia
 Bruce Ackerman (1960), constitutional law scholar, Yale Law School
 Marshall Berman, professor, City College
Charles Cogen, president, New York City's United Federation of Teachers and American Federation of Teachers
Martin S. Fiebert (1956), author, psychologist, professor emeritus, California State University, Long Beach 
 Jeffrey S. Flier (1964), Dean of Harvard Medical School
 Murray Gerstenhaber (born 1927), mathematician and lawyer
 Herb Goldberg, author, psychologist, and male liberation movement activist
 Gene Grossman (1973), former chair, Department of Economics, Princeton University
 Martin Jay (1961), historian, University of California Berkeley
 Richard Kadison (1942), mathematician
 Deborah Frank Lockhart (1965), American Mathematical Society fellow
 Daniel Lowenstein (1960), Director of the Center for Liberal Arts and Institutions, UCLA and first chairman of California Fair Political Practices Commission
 Lynn Mahoney (1982), president, San Francisco State University
 Anthony Marx (1977), president and CEO of New York Public Library and former president, Amherst College
 Richard A. Muller, professor of physics, University of California, Berkeley
 George Ritzer (1958), sociologist
 Michael I. Sovern, former president, Columbia University
 Joan Straumanis (1953), former president, Antioch College
Gregory J. Vincent (1979), president, Hobart and William Smith Colleges
 Jack Russell Weinstein (1987), professor of philosophy and Director of Institute for Philosophy in Public Life, University of North Dakota, and NPR radio host
 Barry Wellman (1959), author, sociologist, founder of International Network for Social Network Analysis, Royal Society of Canada fellow, and developer of the theory of "networked individualism"
Judy Yee, professor of radiology, Albert Einstein College of Medicine

Activism, and government

Seth Andrew (1996), educator and founder, Democracy Prep Public Schools 
Jamaal Bailey (2000), New York State Senator
 Harold Brown (1943), scientist and former United States Secretary of Defense (1977–81)
 Kwame Turé (Stokely Carmichael) (1960), leader of Student Nonviolent Coordinating Committee and Black Panther Party, notable figure in the Civil Rights Movement
 Majora Carter (1984), urban revitalization strategist, 2005 recipient of a MacArthur Fellowship "Genius Grant", 2010 Peabody Award recipient
 Edmond E. Chang (1988), federal judge, U.S. District Court for Northern Illinois
 Richard Danzig (1961), lawyer, former U.S. Secretary of the Navy (1998–2001), and Center for a New American Security chariman
 Jeffrey Dinowitz (1971), New York State Representative
Eric Dinowitz (2003), member of the New York City Council from the 11th district
Harriet Drummond (1969), Alaska state legislator
Martin Garbus (1951), First Amendment lawyer
 Todd Gitlin (1959), writer, social critic, and former president of Students for a Democratic Society
 Harrison J. Goldin (1953), former New York City Comptroller and former New York State Senator
 Alan Grayson (1975) former U.S. Congressman representing Florida's 8th congressional district
Howard Gutman, (1973) lawyer, actor, and former U.S. ambassador to Belgium
Alvin Hellerstein (born 1933), U.S. federal district court judge
 Dora Irizarry (1972), U.S. federal district court judge, U.S. District Court for Eastern District of NEw York
Benjamin Kallos (1999), New York City councilman
G. Oliver Koppell (1958), former New York State attorney general, former New York State Representative, former New York City councilman
 Jeffrey Korman (1963), former New York State Senator
 Kenneth Kronberg (1964), printing company owner and LaRouche movement activist
 Bill Lann Lee (1967), former U.S. Assistant Attorney General in U.S. Justice Department Civil Rights Division and first Asian–American to head the division
 Leonard Lauder (1950), businessman, art collector, and heir to the Estee Lauder fortune.
 Ronald Lauder (1961), businessman, art collector, heir to the Estee Lauder fortune, former U.S. Ambassador to Austria; current president of the World Jewish Congress
 Harold O. Levy (1970), former New York City School Chancellor (2000–02)<ref>{{Cite news| last = Hartocollis| first = Anemona| title = Bronx Science Loses Acting Principal to L.I. School| newspaper = New York Times| date = February 8, 2001| url = https://www.nytimes.com/2001/02/08/nyregion/bronx-science-loses-acting-principal-to-li-school.html| access-date = May 20, 2010| quote = The acting principal of the Bronx High School of Science, one of New York City's most prestigious schools, has taken a job in an affluent Long Island suburb, after a four-month struggle between his supporters and Chancellor Harold O. Levy ... The chancellor, who graduated from Bronx Science in 1970, added: This remains one of the most powerful, terrific schools, with one of the best reputations in the country.}}</ref>
 Ira Millstein (1943), antitrust lawyer, longest-practicing partner in big law
 John Liu (1985), former New York City councilman, former New York City Comptroller, first Asian–American member of New York City Council, and first to hold citywide office
 Nita Lowey (1955), U.S. Congresswoman representing New York's 17th congressional district
Edward Mermelstein (1987), former lawyer and businessman, current Commissioner of the New York City Mayor's Office of International Affairs
 Robert Price (1950), New York State Commissioner of Investigation and former Deputy Mayor of New York City.
 Donald L. Ritter, former U.S. Congressman representing Pennsylvania's 15th congressional district
Martha Shelley, lesbian activist, feminist, writer, and poet
Madeline Singas, Associate Judge, New York Court of Appeals
Toby Ann Stavisky, (1956) Member of the New York State Senate
 Terence Tolbert (1982), political operative and consultant for various New York State politicians; was involved in Barack Obama's presidential campaign

Arts
Fine arts
 Elliott Landy (1959), photographer noted for his work with rock musicians, especially for his work at the Woodstock Festival
 Daniel Libeskind (1965), architect whose designs include Freedom Tower, Jewish Museum Berlin, Felix Nussbaum Haus, and the Royal Ontario Museum
Marilyn Nance (1971), award-winning photographer of spirituality and the African diaspora

Performing arts
 Zack Alford (1983), professional drummer, David Bowie, Bruce Springsteen, and The B-52's)
 Emanuel Azenberg (1951), multiple Tony and Drama Desk Award-winning producer,  noted for his long professional relationship with Neil Simon
 James Bethea (1982), television producer and executive
 Mark Boal (1991), Academy Award-winning screenwriter, The Hurt Locker and Zero Dark Thirty Jessie Cannizzaro (2008), actress, singer, and comedy writer
 Dominic Chianese (1948), singer and actor, The Godfather Part II, Dog Day Afternoon and Junior Soprano on The Sopranos Jon Cryer (1983), two-time Primetime Emmy Award-winning actor (Pretty in Pink, Hot Shots!, Two and a Half Men)
 Bobby Darin (as Walden Robert Cassotto) (1953), Oscar-nominated actor, best known for his work as a songwriter and recording artist ("Mack the Knife", "Beyond the Sea")
 Jon Favreau (1984), screenwriter and actor Rudy and Swingers and director, Elf and Iron Man Jonah Falcon (1988), actor and talk show personality
 Michael Hirsh, head of the Cookie Jar group (animation); founder of Nelvana animation
 Sondra James, actress
 Qurrat Ann Kadwani, television actress, playwright and film producer
 Don Kirshner, music producer and songwriter, best known for his work with The Monkees and for his television show Don Kirshner's Rock Concert James Kyson Lee (1993), actor, best known for his role as Ando Masahashi on the television series Heroes Reggie Lucas, musician, songwriter, and record producer best known for having produced the majority of Madonna's 1983 self-titled debut album.
 Dash Mihok, actor, director, best known for co-starring since 2013 as Brendan "Bunchy" Donovan in the Showtime series Ray Donovan
 Tom Paley (1945), banjo and fiddle player, best known for his association with old-time music; co–founded the New Lost City Ramblers
 Paul Provenza (1975), actor and comedian
 Christopher "Kid" Reid (1982), rap musician, comedian, and actor, best known for being one half of the group Kid 'n Play
 Daphne Maxwell Reid (1966), actress (The Fresh Prince of Bel-Air, Frank's Place), producer, and former model; first African–American homecoming queen at Northwestern University; first African–American to appear on the cover of Glamour Dawn Porter (1984), documentary filmmaker and director
 David Ren, writer, and director
 Esther Scott (1971), film and television actress
 Maggie Siff (1992), actress (Mad Men, Sons of Anarchy, "Billions")
 Mel Simon, businessman and film producer
 Karina Smirnoff, award-winning professional ballroom Latin dancer, who was featured on seven seasons of Dancing With the Stars Worley Thorne, TV screenwriter, script consultant and adjunct assistant professor of English
 Eliot Wald (1962), TV and film writer (Saturday Night Live, Camp Nowhere)
 Boaz Yakin (1983), screenwriter and director

Authors and journalists
Pulitzer Prize winners
 Joseph Lelyveld (1954), journalist and author; Executive Editor at The New York Times (1994–2001); won the 1986 award for General Non-Fiction (Move Your Shadow: South Africa, Black and White)
 William Safire (1947), author and speechwriter; won the 1978 award for Commentary
Buddy Stein (1959), editor and publisher of The Riverdale Press won the 1998 Pulitzer Prize for Editorial Writing for writing on politics and other issues affecting New York City residents.
William Taubman (1958), professor of political science at Amherst College; won the 2004 award for Biography or Autobiography for Khrushchev: The Man and His EraGene Weingarten (1968), reporter and columnist for The Washington Post; won the 2008 and 2010 awards for Feature Writing
Spencer Ackerman (1998), senior national security correspondent for The Daily Beast; was part of a team of editors and reporters awarded the 2014 award for public service journalism, for reporting on Edward Snowden and the National Security Agency's warrantless surveillance programs.

Other authors and journalists

 Judith Baumel (1973), poet; 1987 recipient of the Walt Whitman Award
 Peter S. Beagle (1955), author, singer, and guitarist, best known for The Last Unicorn Jennifer Belle, writer
Joseph Berger, (1962], New York Times reporter, author of memoir "Displaced Persons:Growing Up American After the Holocaust"
Charles Bernstein, poet, essayist, editor, and literary scholar.
 Harold Bloom (1947), influential literary critic, MacArthur Foundation Fellow, and Professor of English at Yale University
 Mark Boal (1991), journalist and screenwriter; won two Oscars as screenwriter and producer of The Hurt Locker Samuel R. Delany (1960), science fiction author (Babel-17, The Einstein Intersection, "Time Considered as a Helix of Semi-Precious Stones"); recipient of four Nebula Awards and two Hugo Awards
 E. L. Doctorow (1948), author (The Book of Daniel, Ragtime, Loon Lake, Billy Bathgate, and The March); received the National Humanities Medal in 1998
 John T. Georgopoulos (1982), award-winning fantasy sports journalist, writer and broadcast radio host
Gerald Jay Goldberg, professor emeritus at the University of California, Los Angeles; novelist and critic
 Jeff Greenfield (1960), television journalist and political analyst for CBS News; author (The People's Choice: A Novel)
 Pablo Guzmán (as Paul Guzman) (1968), television journalist for WCBS-2 in New York; formerly a spokesman for the Young Lords
 Clyde Haberman (1962), columnist for the New York Times Marilyn Hacker (1959), poet, critic, translator, and recipient of the National Book Award
Danny Fingeroth (1971), comic book writer and editor, known for his work on Spiderman
 Lars-Erik Nelson (1959), award-winning correspondent and columnist for the New York Daily News, Newsweek, and Newsday 
 Otto Penzler (1959), editor, author, and collector of espionage and thriller books; received an Edgar Award for Encyclopedia of Mystery & Detection Martin Peretz (1955), former owner and editor-in-chief of The New Republic magazine
 Kevin Phillips (1957), author and political analyst
 Richard Price (1967), author (Bloodbrothers, Clockers, Freedomland, Lush Life); Oscar–nominated screenwriter (The Color of Money)
 James Sanders (1972), architect, author, and Emmy Award-winning screenwriter
 April Smith (1967), author of novels including Be The One, and Good Morning, Killer, and TV scriptwriter for Lou Grant, Chicago Hope, and Cagney & Lacey
 Dava Sobel (1964), author, best known for her popular expositions in the sciences (Longitude: The True Story of a Lone Genius Who Solved the Greatest Scientific Problem of His Time, Galileo's Daughter)
 Norman Spinrad (1957), science fiction author (The Solarians, Bug Jack Barron, The Iron Dream); screenwriter ("The Doomsday Machine" from  Star Trek)
 Gary Weiss (1971), journalist and author
 Dave Winer 1972, computer scientist and blogger
 Min Jin Lee (1986), acclaimed novelist and author of the novels Free Food for Millionaires (2007) and Pachinko (2017).

Business, finance, and economics
 Rose Marie Bravo (1969), vice chairman, Burberry, former President of Saks Fifth Avenue
 Millard Drexler (1962), CEO, J.Crew, former CEO of Gap
 Jerald G. Fishman (1962), CEO, Analog Devices
 Gene Freidman (1988), New York City attorney
Gedale B. Horowitz, partner, Salomon Brothers, former chairman of the Municipal Securities Rulemaking Board
 David Karp, founder, Tumblr
Ray King, entrepreneur
 Leonard Lauder (1950), former president and current chairman, Estée Lauder Companies
 Phil Libin (1989), CEO, EverNote
 Afeni Shakur, activist, businesswoman, and mother of rapper Tupac Shakur
 Lisa Su (1986), CEO and president of Advanced Micro Devices

Science
Nobel Prize-winning scientists

The Bronx High School of Science counts eight Nobel Prize recipients as graduates. Seven of these Nobel laureates received their prize in the field of physics. Robert J. Lefkowitz was awarded the 2012 Nobel Prize in Chemistry.

 Leon N. Cooper (1947), co–developer of BCS theory; namesake of Cooper pairs
 Sheldon Glashow (1950), physicist who proposed the modern electroweak theory (shared the 1979 prize with Weinberg)
 Roy J. Glauber (1941), physicist who made contributions to the quantum theory of optical coherence
 Russell A. Hulse (1966), astrophysicist who co–discovered the first binary pulsar, providing significant evidence in support of the theory of general relativity
 Robert J. Lefkowitz (1959), biochemist known for his work with G protein-coupled receptors
 Hugh David Politzer (1966), physicist who co–discovered asymptotic freedom in quantum chromodynamics
 Melvin Schwartz (1949), physicist who co–developed the neutrino beam method demonstrating of the doublet structure of the lepton through the discovery of the muon neutrino
 Steven Weinberg (1950), physicist who proposed the modern electroweak theory

Other science and engineering alumni
 David Adler (1952), physicist
 Bruce Ames (1946), biologist, inventor of the Ames Test, winner of the National Medal of Science
 Naomi Amir, pediatric neurologist, established first pediatric neurology clinic in Israel
Allen J. Bard, a chemist, Priestley Medal recipient, and an influential pioneer of modern electrochemistry.
Jill Bargonetti (1980), biologist; noted for her work on the function of the oncogene p53
Hans Baruch, physiologist and inventor
 Ira Black, neuroscientist and stem cell researcher, first director of the Stem Cell Institute of New Jersey
 Gregory Chaitin (1964), mathematician, computer scientist, and author; one of the founders of algorithmic information theory; namesake of Chaitin's constant
Rahul Desikan (1995),  neuroscientist and neuroradiologist; known for using 'big data' acquired through ongoing global collaborations, he innovated a variety of cross disciplinary methods to identify novel risk factors for brain diseases
Rana Fine, physical oceanographer, worked on ocean circulation and ventilation
Michael H. Hart, astrophysicist, author of three books on history
 Martin Hellman (1962), electrical engineer and cryptologist who was instrumental in the development of public-key cryptography
 Leonard Kleinrock (1951), electrical engineer and computer scientist; oversaw the first ARPANET connection to the first node at UCLA; supervised sending the first message over what would become the internet
 Andrew R. Koenig (1968), computer scientist, inventor, and author, retired from Bell Labs
 Leslie Lamport (1957), computer scientist noted for fundamental contributions to theory of computing, including distributed systems and the development of LaTeX; 2013 recipient of the ACM Turing Award; namesake of the Lamport signature and Lamport's scheme
 Norman Levitt (1960), author and mathematics professor at Rutgers University; a figure in the fight against anti-intellectualism; his book Higher Superstition: The Academic Left and Its Quarrels with Science inspired the Sokal Affair
 Richard Lindzen, former Alfred P. Sloan Professor of Meteorology at MIT and critic of climate change extremism.
 Barry Mazur, Professor of Mathematics and Gerhard Gade University Professor at Harvard University, a title given to the most distinguished professors at Harvard. Mazur is a recipient of the National Medal of Science and a number of prestigious mathematical prizes, and is a member of the National Academy of Sciences.
 Marvin Minsky (1945), cognitive scientist, computer scientist and inventor; pioneer in artificial intelligence; co-founder of the MIT Computer Science and Artificial Intelligence Laboratory; wrote Society of Mind and The Emotion Machine; patented the confocal microscope; recipient of the Turing Award
 Robert Moog (1952), electrical engineer; pioneer in the development of electronic music, notably for the invention of the Moog synthesizers, still produced by his namesake company
 Jay Pasachoff (1959), astronomy professor at Williams College; textbook writer; expert in astronomy education; director of the Hopkins Observatory; Asteroid 5100 Pasachoff is named in his honor
 Stanley Plotkin (1948), medical doctor, author, and co-creator of vaccines for several diseases including rubella, rabies, rotavirus, and cytomegalovirus
 Stuart Alan Rice, theoretical chemist and physical chemist
 Frank Rosenblatt (1946), computer pioneer; noted for designing Perceptron, one of the first artificial feedforward neural networks; namesake of the Frank Rosenblatt Award given by the Institute of Electrical and Electronics Engineers
 Jun John Sakurai (1951), particle physicist and author, noted for his work on vector mesons; namesake of the Sakurai Prize awarded annually by the American Physical Society
 Myriam Sarachik (1950), solid-state physicist and a former president of the American Physical Society
Edl Schamiloglu, distinguished professor at the Department of Electrical and Computer Engineering of the University of New Mexico
 Ben Shneiderman (1964), developer of computer visualization and human-computer interaction
 Lawrence B. Slobodkin, pioneer in the field of modern ecology
 Leonard Susskind, widely regarded as one of the "fathers" of string theory
Larry Tesler (1961), helped develop modern graphical user interface, invented the cut, copy, and paste commands
Joseph F. Traub, computer scientist
 Neil deGrasse Tyson (1976), astrophysicist and current Director of the Hayden Planetarium, American Museum of natural History; known for his work on educational television, such as NOVA ScienceNOW and Cosmos: A Spacetime Odyssey; namesake of Asteroid 13123 Tyson
 Robert Williamson, molecular biologist and professor of medical genetics from 1995 to 2005 at the Faculty of Medicine, Dentistry and Health Sciences, University of Melbourne
 George Yancopoulos (1976), medical researcher in molecular immunology; member of the National Academy of Sciences; founder and Chief Scientific Officer of Regeneron Pharmaceuticals
 Norton Zinder (1945), biologist in the field of molecular biology; known for his discovery of genetic transduction; recipient of the NAS Award in Molecular Biology from the National Academy of Sciences in 1966; became a member of the National Academy of Sciences in 1969; led a lab at Rockefeller University until shortly before his death

Sports
 Arthur Bisguier, chess grandmaster; 1954 U.S. Chess Champion; won three U.S. Open chess tournaments; played for the U.S. team in five Chess Olympiads
 Robert Ford (1997), radio broadcaster, Houston Astros, one of two full-time African-American play-by-play broadcasters in Major League Baseball
 Michael Kay (1978), New York Yankees sportscaster and current host of The Michael Kay Show Jeanette Lee, professional pool player known by her nickname "The Black Widow"
 Ira Rubin (1946), contract bridge player known as "The Beast" for his aggressive playing style and for inventing three famous bidding systems
 Joel Sherman (1979), Scrabble champion (1997, World Champion; 2002 US Champion)
 Herb Stempel, former contestant on the television game show Twenty One'', known for his contest against Charles Van Doren, and for his role in exposing the subsequent quiz show scandals
Benjamin (Benji) Ungar (born 1986), fencer
 Wolf Wigo (1991), 3-Time Olympic water polo player who was captain of the US National Water Polo Team

References

External links

 1959 alumni take on famous alumni

 
Bronx-related lists
Lists of American people by school affiliation
Lists of people by school affiliation in New York (state)